Parechthistatus gibber is a species of beetle in the family Cerambycidae. It was described by Henry Walter Bates in 1873, originally under the genus Echthistatus.

Subspecies
 Parechthistatus gibber daisen Miyake & Tsuji, 1980
 Parechthistatus gibber gibber (Bates, 1873)
 Parechthistatus gibber grossus (Bates, 1884)
 Parechthistatus gibber longicornis Hayashi, 1951
 Parechthistatus gibber nakanei Miyake, 1980
 Parechthistatus gibber nankiensis Yokoyama, 1980
 Parechthistatus gibber pseudogrossus Miyake, 1980
 Parechthistatus gibber shibatai Miyake, 1980
 Parechthistatus gibber tanakai Miyake, 1980
 Parechthistatus gibber tsushimanus Ohbayashi, 1961

References

Phrissomini
Beetles described in 1873